Pholcomma is a genus of comb-footed spiders that was first described by Tamerlan Thorell in 1869.

Species
 it contains eleven species, found worldwide:
Pholcomma antipodianum (Forster, 1955) – New Zealand (Antipodes Is.)
Pholcomma barnesi Levi, 1957 – USA
Pholcomma carota Levi, 1957 – USA
Pholcomma gibbum (Westring, 1851) (type) – Europe, North Africa, Turkey, Azerbaijan, Iran?
Pholcomma hickmani Forster, 1964 – New Zealand (Campbell Is.)
Pholcomma hirsutum Emerton, 1882 – USA, Canada
Pholcomma mantinum Levi, 1964 – Brazil
Pholcomma micropunctatum (Mello-Leitão, 1941) – Argentina
Pholcomma soloa (Marples, 1955) – Samoa, Niue
Pholcomma tokyoense Ono, 2007 – Japan
Pholcomma turbotti (Marples, 1956) – New Zealand

Formerly included:
P. amamiense Yoshida, 1985 (Transferred to Phycosoma)
P. japonicum Yoshida, 1985 (Transferred to Phycosoma)
P. nigromaculatum Yoshida, 1987 (Transferred to Phycosoma)
P. yunnanense Song & Zhu, 1994 (Transferred to Trogloneta)

See also
 List of Theridiidae species

References

Further reading

Araneomorphae genera
Spiders of Asia
Spiders of New Zealand
Spiders of North America
Spiders of South America
Taxa named by Tamerlan Thorell
Theridiidae